syn-Pimara-7,15-diene synthase (EC 4.2.3.35, 9β-pimara-7,15-diene synthase, OsDTS2, OsKS4) is an enzyme with systematic name 9α-copalyl-diphosphate diphosphate-lyase (9β-pimara-7,15-diene-forming). This enzyme catalyses the following chemical reaction

 9α-copalyl diphosphate  9β-pimara-7,15-diene + diphosphate

This enzyme is a class I terpene synthase.

References

External links 
 

EC 4.2.3